DTS (Diversified Technical Systems) is an American manufacturer of miniature, rugged, data acquisition systems and sensors for product and safety testing in extreme environments. DTS products, made in the U.S., are used in multiple industries including automotive, aerospace, military and defense, industrial, and sports and injury biomechanics.  DTS was founded in 1990 by three crash test engineers: Mike Beckage, Steve Pruitt, and Tim Kippen. The company is headquartered in Seal Beach, California, with technical centers in Michigan, Europe, Japan, China, Korea, and Asia Pacific.

History 

DTS founded their Roller Coaster Testing Services (RSTE) in 1994 and in 1996 became an S-Corporation and introduced production of a modular DAS system, developed for KARCO Engineering (acquired by Applus+ IDIADA). Two years later they introduced their first major DAS product line TDAS PRO.

One year later in 1999 DTS won the Worldwide Side Impact Dummy contract to develop in-dummy DAS. DTS developed and introduced the first centralized in-dummy DAS solution in 2000 and in 2007 expanded beyond the automotive crash market. They also fielded their first helmet sensors in Iraq and Afghanistan with the U.S. Army and U.S. Marine Corp. In the same year DTS introduced new technology in their product line of SLICE, TSR, and angular rate sensors, and also proposed Worldwide Side Impact Dummy WorldSID with SLICE in-dummy DAS.

DTS was awarded their first Small Business Innovation Research Award (SBIR) in 2006 from the Department of Defense to develop a small, self-powered Impact Event Recorder (IER) that could be easily added to head protective equipment.

Inc. Magazine named DTS one of the fastest-growing private companies in the U.S. in 2009-  DTS SLICE (miniature modular DAS)  was used to collect data for new world record when Professor Splash dives from 35' 9" into 12" of water and one year later DTS grew to 50 employees with 6 global offices and 350+ customers. At the end of 2010 the first production version units of HEADS, Headborne Energy Analysis and Diagnostic Systems was delivered, a helmet mounted shock recorder that collects field data to help soldiers determine if they should seek immediate attention for mild traumatic brain injury. In 2011 the first HEADS production lot shipped and the first units were fielded by U.S. Army.

In 2012- NHTSA/Dept. of Transportation selected DTS’ TDAS G5 for 640 channels in new Crash Barrier Load Walls. They introduced the new flexible force sensor and the U.S. Army nameed DTS helmet sensor (HEADS) one of “The greatest inventions of 2011.”. DTS DAS was utilized in the world's biggest remote-controlled plane crash featured on The Discovery Channel "Curiosity." On CBS This Morning and CBS Nightline DTS DAS was featured in “Smart Dummies” about General Motors and “Brace for Impact.” and delivered the 40,000th helmet recorder to the U.S. Army. Inc. Magazine named DTS one of the fastest-growing private companies in the U.S. for the 2nd time.

In 2013 DTS moved to 50,000 sq. ft. corporate headquarters in Seal Beach, California, with over 80 employees and Technical Centers in North America, Europe & Asia-Pacific, and then in 2014 DTS was named by Inc. 5000 for a third time as one of the fastest growing private companies in the United States. In the following year, 2015, DTS is awarded the U.S. Army contract to engineer and deliver a working prototype of WIAMan, the first blast test dummy, and in 2014 DTS delivered 18,000 additional helmet sensors to the U.S. Army.

The WIAMan program advanced and DTS delivered the technical data package (TDP) to the Army's WIAMan Engineering Office in 2018. In 2019 Mike Beckage, DTS co-founder and CTO, was inducted into the Cal Poly Pomona College of Engineering Hall of Fame.

On June 1, 2021, Diversified Technical Systems (DTS) became part of Vishay Precision Group, Inc. (NYSE: VPG).

In 2022, for the 3rd year in a row, DTS is named one of the best places to work in Orange County, California by the BestCompaniesGroup. NASA Artemis 1 launches on November 16  with DTS TSR PRO onboard to gather data during the mission.

March 2023, DTS announces the release of the TSR AIR Universal Data Logger.

Headquarters and technical centers

DTS Headquarters 
Seal Beach, California, U.S.A.

Technical centers 
United States - Novi, Michigan 
Europe
Lincolnshire, United Kingdom English and German Language Support
Gennevilliers, France, French, English and Spanish support
Tokyo, Japan
Shanghai, China
Seongnam-si, South Korea
Asia Pacific

DTS products

Data Acquisition Systems (DAS), sensors and software

Aerospace : Modification testing, in-flight testing, seat testing, UAV & drones, parachutes, ejection seats, wind tunnels, and crash survivability.
 NASA Mars Sample Return Mission: SLICENANO part of instrumentation for OS-3E test article for Mars sample return mission.    
 NASA Testing: DTS DAS equipment used for environmental and shock tests on equipment such as Perseverance low density supersonic decelerator. 

 NASA Artemis 1: TSR PRO used to help quantify acceleration profile of crew seat backs and will help gather data during the mission.
 In-flight testing: in-flight physical measurements on first test mission of SpaceX's crew Dragon Capsule. Anthropomorphic test device "Ripley" embedded with DTS miniature shock-tested angular rate sensors 
 Space Capsule Testing: DTS modular DAS equipment used on series of water-impact tests on the 18,000 lb. Orion mock-up capsule for Artemis Moon Missions 
 Supersonic Decelerator:NASA Neutral Buoyancy Lab (LDSD) utilizes DTS SLICE NANO/MICRO technology
 Federal Aviation Administration (FAA): FAA/CAMI seat and restraint system safety testing
Boeing Starliner 100. DTS DAS installed on spacecraft to test performance of reentry parachutes and spacecraft loading. 
Automotive: Safety testing, crash testing, pedestrian safety, rollover, airbag, NVH, road load, rotation and torque, off road testing, and sled testing. 

 Crash testing: National Highway Traffic Safety Administration (NHTSA), Insurance Institute for Highway Safety IIHS use DTS equipment for regulation safety testing.
 ARS PRO sensor used for NHTSA FMVSS 202a Rear Impact Test (see page 15)
 DTS equipment used for Euro NCAP, Global NCAP automotive regulation safety testing
 NASCAR: Every NASCAR race vehicle has a DTS data recorder. 
Military & Defense: Military vehicle testing, blast testing, helmet recorders, over-pressure, ballistics, and missile/ordnance. 
 Helicopter Drop Tests: Instrumented test manikins including in-dummy and offboard DTS DAS sensors and data recorders were used on full scale drop tests of 45' CH-46E Sea Knight Marine Helicopter at NASA Langley's Landing and Impact Research (LANDIR) facility.
 Personnel High Rate Data Recorder: DTS data recorder designed to embed in helmets to record an unexpected event during training or mission operations to improve protection for military personnel.
 Ejection Event: Dynamic Impact Recorder to record head/neck 6DOF (degrees of freedom) angular motion for pilots during ejection event.
Injury Biomechanics: Occupant safety, Helmet testing, blunt trauma, traumatic brain injury (TBI), PMHS testing, research, and racehorse injury prevention.
 Advanced Injury Analysis: Analyzing blunt and penetrating trauma injuries at the Biomechanics Injury Research (BIR) Laboratory at USC using custom integrated DTS DAS and sensors in a Side Impact Dummy (Mil-SID), NOCSAE headforms, Hybrid III headforms and Sport Thoracic Chest Surrogate (STCS).
Sports & Recreation: Sports helmets, bicycles, skis, roller coasters, and sports performance analysis. 
 Football:  Dynamic Kinematic Recorder (DKR) to measure biomechanical vibration, impact and motion for football players.
Industrial: Wind turbines, mining, product development, robots, package transit, oil and gas. 
 Measure shock and vibration data experienced by autonomous robots and robotic fixtures.
 Collect field test data for mining, high rate shock and vibration data, equipment validation, down-hole and blast detonations.
 Collect physical measurements on oil and gas pipelines and industrial equipment
 Data collection on rotating applications - shock, vibration and strain data on wind turbines.
Other Vehicles: Motorsports, Marine, Heavy Equipment, Trains & Rails
 Motorcycle testing: eXcentive used DTS to test strain, acceleration and vibration on new motorbike fork with deformable quadrilateral.

ATD Solutions/Integrated Data Acquisition Systems for Crash Test Dummies

Warrior Blast Manikin (WIAMan)
Prime contractor to the U.S. Army for the WIAMan, the U.S. Army Warrior Injury Assessment Manikin. DTS builds both the manikin and in-dummy data acquisition and sensor system, the SLICE6. WIAMan is the first anthropomorphic test device (ATD) designed specifically to withstand underbody blasts, like IEDs.

Worldwide Side Impact Dummy (WorldSID)
The first regulation ATD for automotive safety testing is designed with DTS dummy DAS. The WorldSID is a project to develop a new generation of dummy under the International Organization for Standardization "WorldSID heralds a significant improvement in the ability of crash dummies to duplicate human motions and responses in side impact tests."

THOR – 50M
The SLICE6 THOR dummy is the most advanced ATD with embedded DAS for Euro NCAP automotive safety testing. Thor is the most realistic ATD to date.

Hybrid III 50/95/5
Frontal impact Hybrid iii dummy with integrated DAS.

Pedestrian headforms
Pedestrian headform impactor with SLICEware for pedestrian safety testing.
Free Motion Headform
Free Motion Headform with DTS SLICE NANO for automotive safety testing.
SLICE Advanced Pedestrian Legform Impactor and FLEX PLI Legform
Flexible Pedestrian Legform Impactor (FLEX PLI) with SLICE NANO and 6DX PRO sensor for pedestrian protection testing.

Awards and recognition

Small business innovation research awards 

National Aeronautics and Space Administration 
Crew Worn Acceleration Recorder for Spaceflight Phase I
Crew Worn Acceleration Recorder for Spaceflight Phase II 
Department of Defense
Rotorcraft Crash Sensor for Active Safety Systems and Mishap Dynamics Recording Phase I
In-Ear Exposure Sensor with Integrated Noise Attenuation and Communications Capabilities Phase I/Phase II
6DOF Sensing & Dynamic Impact Recorder for Measurement of Ejection Even Biodynamics Phase I
6DOF Sensing & Dynamic Impact Recorder for Measurement of Ejection Even Biodynamics Phase II
Personnel High Rate Data Recorder Phase I
Personnel High Rate Data Recorder Phase II
Digital Data Recorder for Gauges in High Speed Weapons During Survivability Testing Phase I
Smart Automatic Jettisoning Device for Helmet Mounted Display System (HMDS) Phase I
ASPRIRE: A Survivable, Programmable, Integrated Recorder for Experiments Phase I
ASPRIRE: A Survivable, Programmable, Integrated Recorder for Experiments Phase II
Immunity from Threat Based on Measured Injury Causation Phase I
Department of Transportation
6 Dimensional Sensor Package (6DSP) Phase I

Technology innovation awards
2007 BAE Systems Chairman Award: Bronze level award for innovation and technology
2008 Best of Sensors Award – SLICE NANO & MICRO: Gold award for innovative miniaturized data recorders
2009 Best of Sensors Award – 6DX
2010 Best of Sensors Award – TSR: Gold award for innovative new shock recorder with built-in sensors
2010Gold award for best new product in sensor category
2011 Best of Sensors Award – SLICE MICRO IEPE: Bronze award for new data acquisition features supporting IEPE (piezo-electric) sensors
2012 BAE Award: Supplier Excellence Award from BAE Systems
2012 BAE Systems Chairman Award: Bronze level award for innovation and technology

Resources 

1990 establishments in the United States
Companies based in Orange County, California
Technology companies based in Greater Los Angeles